Foa is an island in Tonga. It is located within the Haapai group in the centre of the country, to northeast of the national capital of Nukualofa.

Foa is linked to adjacent Lifuka Island by a causeway, and is located 640 metres northeast of Lifuka.

The island has an area of 13.39 km2. The population as of the 2016 census was 1,392

History 
Ancient petroglyphs on the northern end of Foa show evidence that the island has been inhabited by native tribes for hundreds of years, but since then they have been exposed by beach erosion. In 2012, the wreck of the pirate ship Port-au-Prince was discovered off the coast of the island.

Settlements 
Faleloa
Fangaleounga
Fotua
Lotofoa

See also 
 List of cities in Tonga

References

External links  
 Lifuka & Foa

Islands of Tonga
Haʻapai